Polaris are an Australian metalcore band from Sydney, New South Wales. The band consists of vocalist Jamie Hails, guitarists Ryan Siew and Rick Schneider, bassist/clean vocalist Jake Steinhauser and drummer Daniel Furnari. They released their debut album The Mortal Coil on 3 November 2017 to critical acclaim and it was nominated for the 2018 ARIA Award for Best Hard Rock. On 14 November 2019 Polaris announced their second full length titled The Death of Me, released on 21 February 2020 through Resist/SharpTone records subsequently earning their second ARIA Award nomination.

Polaris are known for blending elements of metalcore with progressive/post-rock soundscapes, electronics and melodic hooks, intertwined with personal lyrics — often dealing with anxiety, depression and loss.

History

Early career & Dichotomy (2012–2013) 
Polaris was formed in 2012 by drummer Daniel Furnari and Jake Steinhauser on guitar after meeting at their high school battle of the bands, quickly discovering a mutual love for metal and alternative music. The two then recruited guitarist Rick Schneider and vocalist Jamie Hails through mutual friends and word of mouth. Matt Steinhauser, Jake's brother, was brought on board to handle bass duties and completed the line-up with James West on synth/keys. The group began working on music together writing and recording their first single "Summit" and the majority of the Dichotomy EP in early 2012. In late 2012, Polaris announced the departure of both Matt Steinhauser and West. Guitarist Jake then switched onto bass to focus on his singing, as the band was pushing towards a more progressive sound.

The band began looking for a new guitarist, holding public auditions. On 18 November 2013, the band announced Ryan Siew, as their new guitarist, who was 15 years old at the time. Shortly after joining the Dichotomy EP was released on 29 November 2013 independently.

The Guilt & The Grief (2014–2016) 
On 3 March 2015, the single "Unfamiliar" was released; it was the first track to feature Siew as lead guitarist. Polaris continued to write and finished an additional 5 tracks to complete their second EP titled The Guilt & The Grief. The EP was recorded with Sonny True Love and Evan Lee at STL studios on the North Coast of NSW, and it was mixed by Carson Slovak and Grant McFarland of Atrium Audio in Pennsylvania, USA. The Guilt & The Grief was released independently by the band on 29 January 2016 and landed at #34 on the ARIA charts.

The Mortal Coil (2017-2018) 
On 3 November 2017, Polaris released their first studio album The Mortal Coil through Resist Records and Sharptone Records. The album was nominated for the 2018 ARIA Award for Best Hard Rock or Heavy Metal Album as well as for the Australian Album of the Year award at the J Awards.

The Death of Me (2019-present) 
On 21 February 2020, Polaris released their second studio album The Death of Me, also through Resist Records and Sharptone Records. The album was nominated for the 2020 ARIA Award for Best Hard Rock or Heavy Metal Album. On 3 July 2020, the band released the instrumental editions of their albums, The Mortal Coil and The Death of Me.

In an interview with Wall of Sound, Jamie Hails confirmed the band have been working on new material during the pandemic, which they will not be releasing until they have toured The Death of Me internationally.

On 27 July 2022, Australian electronic artist and producer PhaseOne released a collaboration track with the band entitled "Icarus", marking the first time the band have collaborated with another artist on new music.

On 4 November 2022, Polaris announced via social media "We have entered the studio to begin assembling our next body of work" with their live sound engineer Lance Prenc at Kinglake Studios in Melbourne.

Members

Current
Daniel Furnari – drums (2012–present) 
Jamie Hails – unclean vocals (2012–present), clean vocals (2017–present)
Rick Schneider – rhythm guitar (2013–present), lead guitar (2012–2013)
Jake Steinhauser – clean vocals (2012–present), bass (2013–present); rhythm guitar (2012-2013) 
Ryan Siew – lead guitar (2013–present)

Former
James West – synthesizer, keyboards (2012-2014)
Matt Steinhauser – bass (2012−2013)

Timeline

Discography

Studio albums

EPs

Awards and nominations

AIR Awards
The Australian Independent Record Awards (known colloquially as the AIR Awards) is an annual awards night to recognise, promote and celebrate the success of Australia's Independent Music sector.

! 
|-
| 2021
| The Death of Me
| Best Independent Heavy Album or EP
| 
| 
|}

APRA Awards
The APRA Awards are presented annually from 1982 by the Australasian Performing Right Association (APRA), "honouring composers and songwriters". They commenced in 1982.

! 
|-
| 2021 
| "Masochist" (Jamie Hails, Daniel Furnari, Rick Schneider, Ryan Siew, Jacob Steinhauser)
| Song of the Year
| 
| 
|-

ARIA Music Awards
The ARIA Music Awards is an annual awards ceremony that recognises excellence, innovation, and achievement across all genres of Australian music. 

|-
| 2018
| The Mortal Coil
| Best Hard Rock/Heavy Metal Album
| 
|-
| 2020
| The Death of Me
| Best Hard Rock/Heavy Metal Album
| 
|-

J Award
The J Awards are an annual series of Australian music awards that were established by the Australian Broadcasting Corporation's youth-focused radio station Triple J. They commenced in 2005.

|-
| J Awards of 2018
| The Mortal Coil
| Australian Album of the Year
|

Rolling Stone Australia Awards
The Rolling Stone Australia Awards are awarded annually in January or February by the Australian edition of Rolling Stone magazine for outstanding contributions to popular culture in the previous year.

! 
|-
| 2021
| The Death of Me
| Best Record
| 
| 
|-

References

Musical groups established in 2012
Musical groups from Sydney
Australian metalcore musical groups
2012 establishments in Australia